Awadh Khamis Al-Faraj (born July 15, 1988) is a Saudi Arabian footballer who currently plays as a midfielder for Al-Raed.

Club career
Awadh Khamis started his career at Najran and is a product of Najran's youth system. He made his debut for Najran on 25 February 2011 in the league match against Al-Ettifaq replacing Turky Al-Thagafi in the 76th minute. He scored his first goal for the club on 20 March 2011 in the league match against Al-Shabab. He made 37 appearances and scored 6 goals for the club throughout all competitions.

On 30 April 2012, Awadh Khamis signed a five-year contract with Al-Nassr. On 2 August 2012, Khamis made his debut for Al-Nassr against Al-Fateh in the Pro League, replacing Damián Manso. In his first year with the club, he participated in six games across all competitions. In his second season at the club, Khamis established himself as a starter and played a vital role in helping the club win their first league title since 1995. On 1 February 2014, Khamis started the 2014 Crown Prince Cup final and helped the club win their first title since 1974. In the 2014–15 season, Khamis made 19 appearances in the league as he helped the club win a second consecutive league title.

On 10 February 2017, Al-Hilal announced that Awadh Khamis would sign for the club on a free transfer. However, 11 days later, Al-Nassr announced that they had renewed Khamis' contract for another three years. On 24 October 2017, it was announced that the situation had been resolved and Al-Nassr had to pay Al-Hilal SAR6 million.

Following the expiry of his contract, Awadh Khamis joined Al-Raed on a two-year contract on 30 August 2020.

Career statistics

Club
As of 30 May 2021.

Honours

Clubs
Al-Nassr
 Saudi Professional League: 2013–14, 2014–15, 2018–19
 Saudi Crown Prince Cup: 2013–14
 Saudi Super Cup: 2019

References

1988 births
Living people
People from Najran
Association football fullbacks
Association football midfielders
Saudi Arabian footballers
Saudi Arabia international footballers
Najran SC players
Al Nassr FC players
Al-Raed FC players
Saudi Professional League players